Claude Jean Pierre Dagens (born 20 May 1940 in Bordeaux, Gironde) is a French prelate of the Roman Catholic Church, serving as bishop of Angoulême.

Previously the auxiliary bishop of the diocese of Poitiers from 1999 to 2005, he is a specialist in Catholic doctrine, and was elected the twentieth member to occupy seat 1 of the Académie française April 2008. He has written abundantly about the role of the Church in French society and its relationship with secularism.

Because of his dialogue with members of Freemasonry, he has provoked the irritation of some Traditionalist Catholics (see Catholicism and Freemasonry).

References

1940 births
Living people
Clergy from Bordeaux
École Normale Supérieure alumni
French Roman Catholic writers
Bishops of Angoulême
Members of the Académie Française
Officiers of the Légion d'honneur
21st-century French Roman Catholic bishops